The Sky Flare is a Czech single-place paraglider, designed and produced by Sky Paragliders of Frýdlant nad Ostravicí.

Design and development
The Flare was designed as a competition glider. The models are each named for their approximate wing area in square metres.

The design was produced from 2001 until 2004, but is now out of production.

Variants
Flare 24
Small-sized model for lighter pilots. The glider model is AFNOR Competition and DHV CIVL  certified.
Flare 26
Mid-sized model for medium-weight pilots. The glider model is AFNOR Competition and DHV CIVL certified.
Flare 29
Large-sized model for heavier pilots. The glider model is AFNOR Competition and DHV CIVL  certified.

Specifications (Flare 26)

References

External links

Flare
Paragliders